The Bastards can refer to:

 The Bastards (film), 2007 Romanian film
 Bastard brothers, 18th century British surveyor-architects and civic dignitaries
 The Bastards (album), a 2020 album by Palaye Royale

See also
 
 Bastard (disambiguation)
 Bastards (disambiguation)